Tomasz Hołota (born 27 January 1991) is a Polish professional footballer who plays as a midfielder for Sparta Katowice.

Club career
On 19 May 2017, he joined Pogoń Szczecin.

On 22 September 2020, Hołota signed a one-season contract with KKS 1925 Kalisz.

International career
He was called up to the Poland national football team in November 2013 for friendlies, but remained on the bench.

Career statistics

Club

References

1991 births
Living people
Sportspeople from Katowice
Polish footballers
Poland youth international footballers
Association football midfielders
GKS Katowice players
Polonia Warsaw players
Śląsk Wrocław players
Arminia Bielefeld players
Pogoń Szczecin players
Zagłębie Sosnowiec players
Ekstraklasa players
I liga players
II liga players
III liga players
2. Bundesliga players
Polish expatriate footballers
Expatriate footballers in Germany
Polish expatriate sportspeople in Germany